Aestuariibacter is a genus in the class Gammaproteobacteria (Bacteria), composed of four species, namely A. aggregatus, A. halophilus, A. litoralis and the type species A. salexigens.
These are strictly aerobic marine rod-shaped bacteria. They share many traits with the sister genus Alteromonas, the type genus of the family (Alteromonadaceae) and order (Alteromonadales).

Etymology
The name Aestuariibacter derives from the Latin noun aestuarium, a tidal flat (the part of the sea coast which, during the flood-tide, is overflowed, but at ebb-tide is left covered with mud or slime) and the New Latin masculine gender noun bacter, bacterium and thus means a tidal-flat bacterium, as three species, except A. halophilus from the Yellow sea, were isolated in tidal flats.

References 

Bacteria genera
Actinomycetota